This is a list of the Military Order of Maria Theresa (German: Militär-Maria-Theresien-Orden, Croatian: Vojni Red Marije Terezije) recipients of Croatian origin in alphabetical order:

See also

 Habsburg monarchy
 Orders, decorations, and medals of Austria-Hungary
 Orders, decorations, and medals of Croatia
 List of Croatian soldiers
 List of honours of Croatia awarded to heads of state and royals

External links 

 List of all recipients of the Order between 1914 and 1918
 Some of recipients of the Order from Croatia (in Croatian)

Military order
Military order
Military order

Military order
Military order